Kyo-hwa-so No. 88 Wonsan(원산 88호 교화소) is a "reeducation camp" in Wonsan, Kangwŏn. Its number of prisoners is currently unknown.

See also 
 Human Rights in North Korea
 Prisons in North Korea

References

External links 
  - Overview of North Korean reeducation camps with testimonies and satellite photographs

Concentration camps in North Korea